Roy Cooling (9 December 1921 – 10 April 2003) was an English footballer who played as an inside forward. He played for Mitchell Main Welfare, Barnsley and Mansfield Town.

Notes

1921 births
Footballers from Barnsley
2003 deaths
English footballers
Association football inside forwards
Barnsley F.C. players
Mansfield Town F.C. players
English Football League players